Jacopino della Scala (died 1215), an Italian merchant and politician, was a member of the Scaliger family of future lords of Verona. He was the son of Leonardo della Scala, and also the grandson of Karafina Gambarelli and her husband Balduino della Scala, son of Arduino della Scala, who gave rise to the Della Scala dynasty

Initially he worked as wool trader, not rich and without any noble title. However, his friendship network and political skills granted him the title of Imperial vicar at Ostiglia, and podestà of Cerea. He was an ancestor of most European monarchs.

He was the father of Mastino I (Leonardo), Alberto I, Manfredo and Bocca della Scala. 
He is the first relative of Napoleon I, Emperor of the French.

Sources

12th-century births
1215 deaths
Jacopino